Cathedral Rock is a national park  west of Waterfall Way in New South Wales, Australia,  east of Armidale and about  north of Sydney.

This park is lying between the Guy Fawkes River and Macleay Range, and is about six kilometres west of Ebor, New South Wales.

The highest peak of the New England Tableland, Round Mountain, is located in the park.

This is a great place for hiking, camping, picnicking and bird watching. Black cockatoos, a rare turquoise parrot and a wedge-tailed eagle can be found circling the surrounding cliffs in search of prey.

See also

 Protected areas of New South Wales

References

National parks of New South Wales
Northern Tablelands
Protected areas established in 1978
1978 establishments in Australia